Meshir 8 - Coptic Calendar - Meshir 10

The ninth day of the Coptic month of Meshir, the sixth month of the Coptic year. On a common year, this day corresponds to February 3, of the Julian Calendar, and February 16, of the Gregorian Calendar. This day falls in the Coptic Season of Shemu, the season of the Harvest.

Commemorations

Martyrs 

 The martyrdom of Saint Paul the Syrian 
 The martyrdom of Saint Simeon

Saints 

 The departure of Saint Barsauma, the Father of the Syrian Monks 
 The departure of Saint Euphrosyne of Alexandria

References 

Days of the Coptic calendar